Rockton Aerodrome  is located in Flamborough, Ontario  west of Rockton, Ontario, Canada.

Description
The registered aerodrome is owned and operated by the SOSA Gliding Club as a private airfield. Prior permission is required to fly in (except for gliders).

Facilities include two hangars, a workshop, a clubhouse and a campground for members.

There are three turf runways at the Rockton Aerodrome: 36/18, 03/21, and 10/28. Field elevation is 846 ft ASL.

In the spring the runways are quite soft and it is not recommended that powered aircraft attempt landing without first speaking with someone on the ground (after having previously received prior permission by phone).

Powered aircraft fly right hand circuits and gliders fly left hand circuits to all runways.

Rockton is a busy aerodrome with around 14,000 aircraft movements per year. The majority of these take place on weekends from May through October. During daylight hours on summer weekends, it is not unusual to have 10-20 gliders within 5 miles of the airport so a good lookout is required while flying near the Rockton Aerodrome.  Aircraft transitioning to Burlington Airpark and other local airports are reminded of the CAR's requirement to maintain a minimum altitude of 2000 ft AAE at all times and to remain clear of the circuit for all runways at all times.  Practised forced landings at the Rockton aerodrome are strictly prohibited 365 days per year.

SOSA Gliding Club is a non-profit corporation run solely by volunteer members. SOSA offers basic flight training to those who wish to become licensed glider pilots, as well as aerobatic training and Cross-country training to licensed glider pilots.

SOSA owns a fleet of 11 gliders and four towplanes. Basic and Aerobatic training is conducted in three Schleicher ASK 21 gliders and an SZD 50-3 Puchacz. A Schempp-Hirth Duo Discus XL is used for cross-country training. Single seat gliders include a Schempp-Hirth Discus-2, three SZD 51-1 Juniors, and two Rolladen-Schneider LS4s. The towplane fleet consists of three Piper PA-25 Pawnees and a 7GCBC Bellanca Citabria.

References

External links
SOSA Gliding Club
Page about this airport on COPA's Places to Fly airport directory

Registered aerodromes in Ontario
Transport buildings and structures in Hamilton, Ontario